SCR J1546−5534 is a red dwarf star located in the constellation Norma. Identified in 2011, it was the reddest and second nearest object discovered in the SuperCOSMOS-RECONS (SCR) searches of the sky where proper motions were analysed. Optical analysis of its spectrum yields an effective (surface) temperature of 2700 K and spectrum of M7.5.

References

M-type main-sequence stars
Norma (constellation)